Triphosa is a genus of moths in the family Geometridae, subfamily Larentiinae. The genus was first described by Stephens in 1829. The larvae or caterpillars are commonly called meters, hence the name of the family. These species in Colombia are little known and studied, in addition to the inclusion of its high rate of species.

Some plants associated with gender of these butterflies are: Rhamnus (Rhamnaceae), Prunus (Rosaceae).

Species
Species include:
Triphosa atrifascia Inoue, 2004
Triphosa bipectinata Barnes & McDunnough, 1917
Triphosa californiata (Packard, 1871)
Triphosa dubitata Linnaeus, 1758
Triphosa haesitata (Guenée in Boisduval & Guenée, 1858)
Triphosa lugens Bastelberger, 1909
Triphosa praesumtiosa Prout, 1941
Triphosa quasiplaga Dyar, 1913
Triphosa rantaizanensis Wileman, 1916
Triphosa rotundata Inoue, 2004
Triphosa rubrifusa Bastelberger, 1909
Triphosa sabaudiata (Duponchel, 1830)
Triphosa tritocelidata Aurivillius, 1910
Triphosa umbraria (Leech, 1891)

References

 

Rheumapterini